Phostria jansei is a moth in the family Crambidae. It was described by West in 1931. It is found in the Philippines (Luzon).

References

Phostria
Moths described in 1931
Moths of Asia